Slam 'N Jam '95 is a video game developed by Left Field Productions and published by Crystal Dynamics for the 3DO. Van Earl Wright was the announcer's voice for the game.

Gameplay
Slam 'N Jam '95 is a basketball game, but is not licensed by the NBA.

Reception
Next Generation reviewed the 3DO version of the game, rating it four stars out of five, and stated that "The pace is lightning fast, and when you hear the roar of the crowd, it's bound to give you chills. If you have any interest in the sport at all and own a 3DO, this is a must-have."

Next Generation reviewed the PlayStation version of the game, rating it three stars out of five, and stated that "It's still a great two-player game, but the one-player game doesn't hold its end up, and the technological race is passing this game right by."

Joel Easley from Kokomo Tribune reviewed the game and stated  that "Overall, Slam 'N Jam '95 is a solid two-player title for someone with an acquired athletic taste.

The game was awarded the 3DO Sports game of the year.

Reviews
GameFan (Jun, 1995)
Electronic Gaming Monthly (Aug, 1995)
GamePro (Aug, 1995)
Video Games & Computer Entertainment - Jun, 1995
The Video Game Critic (Feb 13, 2006)
GamesCollection (Mar 27, 2008) (Italian)
Mega Fun (Jun, 1995)

Notes

References

External links
 Slam 'N Jam '95 at GameFAQs
 Slam 'N Jam '95 at Giant Bomb
 Slam 'N Jam '95 at MobyGames

1995 video games
3DO Interactive Multiplayer games
3DO Interactive Multiplayer-only games
Basketball video games
Crystal Dynamics games
Left Field Productions games
Multiplayer and single-player video games
Video games developed in the United States
Video games scored by Burke Trieschmann